Levan Chilachava (Georgian: ლევან ჩილაჩავა) (born 17 August 1991 in Sokhumi, Georgia) is a Georgian rugby union player. He plays prop for Georgia on international level. Chilachava also plays for French club, Toulon in the Top 14 competition.

On the 11 February 2012 Chilachava made his debut for Georgia against Spain in the European Nations Cup. He then was named in Georgia's 2012 end of year tour squad.

Career statistics
.

References

External links
 

1991 births
Living people
Sportspeople from Sukhumi
Rugby union players from Georgia (country)
Rugby union props
RC Toulonnais players
Expatriate rugby union players from Georgia (country)
Expatriate rugby union players in France
Expatriate sportspeople from Georgia (country) in France
Georgia international rugby union players
Castres Olympique players
Montpellier Hérault Rugby players